The Spanish dancer, scientific name Hexabranchus sanguineus (literally meaning "blood-colored six-gills"), is a dorid nudibranch, a very large and colorful sea slug, a marine gastropod mollusk in the family Hexabranchidae.

Description
 
The Spanish dancer is a large dorid nudibranch which can grow up to a maximum length of 60 cm.
However, the commonly observed size is between 20 and 30 cm long.
Its body coloration is generally orange-red speckled with multiple small white dots but it also can be uniformly bright red or yellow with red scattered spots.
Its body is soft and flattened, the anterior dorsal portion has a pair of retractable rhinophores and the posterior part has six contractile gills inserted independently in the body. The pair of oral tentacles are constituted by a fin flexible membrane provided with large digital lobes.

In a normal situation when the animal is crawling, the edges of its mantle are curled upwards creating a peripheral blister. If the animal is disturbed, it unfolds its edges and can swim through contractions and undulations of the body to move away from the disturbing element. Its common name, Spanish dancer, comes from this particular defense.

Juveniles are rather whitish to yellowish with multiple purplish points and orange rhinophores and gills.

Distribution and habitat
The Spanish dancer is widespread throughout the tropical and subtropical waters of the Indo-Pacific area from the eastern coasts of Africa, Red Sea included, to Hawaii and from south Japan to Australia.

It likes rocky and coral reefs with many sponges and shelters from 1 to 50 meters deep.

Biology
During daytime, the Spanish dancer hides away from the light in the crevices of its natural habitat to only come out late at night.
It feeds on various species of sponge.
Like all nudibranchs, it is hermaphrodite and its bright red to pink egg ribbon has a spiral shape related to the size of the animal so relatively large. The Spanish Dancer consumes sponges among the family Halichondria. Once consumed, the Spanish Dancer derives a potent chemical that it can use as defense. Hexabranchus sanguineus then passes the defensive compounds obtained into its egg ribbons via macrolides, giving the physically defenseless egg ribbons a toxin defense. The latter is coveted by some other species of nudibranch as  Favorinus tsuruganus  or  Favorinus japonicus.
The Emperor shrimp, Periclimenes imperator, is a commensal shrimp that is commonly found living on Hexabranchus sanguineus.

References

External links

 
 Hexabranchus sanguineus at Nudipixel
 Image of the yellow variant at the Slugsite
 Video of a Spanish dancer from "Shuniyot", a shared 1988 Israeli and BBC production 
 

Hexabranchidae
Gastropods described in 1828